Victor Prouvé, born 13 August 1858 in Nancy, dead 15 February 1943 at Sétif (Algeria), was a French painter, sculptor and engraver of the Art Nouveau École de Nancy.

He designed decors of glass works and furniture for Émile Gallé. He worked for Eugène Vallin, Fernand Courteix, the Daum Brothers and Albert Heymann. He worked on book bindings with Camille Martin and the bookbinder René Wiener.

In 1888, he discovered Tunisia, which influenced the light of his paintings.

In 1890 he went with the dissenting artists to the new Société des Beaux-Arts.

He became the second president of the École de Nancy at Émile Gallé's death, in 1904. From 1919 to 1940, he took the direction of the School of Fine Arts of Nancy.

He was the father of architect and designer Jean Prouvé (1901–1984).

Works
Selection of works by Victor Prouvé :

Bibliography

 Edmonde Charles-Roux (et al.), Victor Prouvé : voyages en Tunisie (1888–1890): dessins, aquarelles, huiles, exhibition catalogue, Éditions Serpenoise (Metz), 1999, 95 p. .
 Jean-Paul Midant, L'art nouveau en France, Les Éditions du Carrousel (Paris), 1999, 174 p.
 Madeleine Prouvé, Victor Prouvé, 1858–1943, preface of Jean Lurçat, Berger-Levrault (Paris), 1958, 204 p.
 Jean Perrin, « La collaboration entre Émile Gallé et Victor Prouvé », in Annales de l'Est, special issue, 2005, pp. 199–210
 Anne-Laure Carré, Victor Prouvé, 1858–1943, catalogue of the eponym exhibitions presented in Nancy from 17 May to 21 September 2008, Paris/Nancy, Gallimard/City of Nancy, 2008, 299 pages.
 Christian Debize, Dominique de Font-Réaulx, Sophie Harent, Emmanuelle Héran, Blandine Otter, Bénédicte Pasques, Jérôme Perrin, Philippe Thiébaut and Claude Tillier, Victor Prouvé (1858–1943), Gallimard, Paris, 2008, 306 p., 463 ill., .
 Danielle Birck, « École de Nancy : la preuve par Prouvé, Victor », on the site of Radio France International.

Notes and references

External links
 Victor Prouvé on the site of the École de Nancy.
 Victor Prouvé – The École de Nancy years.
 Victor Prouvé on the GeneaNet website.
 Victor Prouvé on the site of Galerie Laurencin in Lyons.
 Scanned works of Victor Prouvé in the Europeana website.
 Victor Prouvé exhibitions in Nancy in 2008.

Members of the École de Nancy
1858 births
1943 deaths
19th-century French painters
French male painters
20th-century French painters
20th-century French male artists
Commandeurs of the Légion d'honneur
French portrait painters
Art Nouveau painters
Art Nouveau sculptors
20th-century French sculptors
19th-century  French sculptors
19th-century French male artists